Julien Laporte (born 4 November 1993) is a French professional footballer who plays as a defender for FC Lorient.

References

1993 births
Living people
Footballers from Auvergne-Rhône-Alpes
Sportspeople from Clermont-Ferrand
French footballers
Association football defenders
Ligue 1 players
Ligue 2 players
FC Aurillac Arpajon Cantal Auvergne players
Clermont Foot players
FC Lorient players